Uwe Reuß (born 3 March 1947, Friedberg/Hessen, † March 2022 Hamburg), known as Johnny Tame, was a German singer-songwriter and guitarist. He started his musical career in the early 1960s and gained remarkable national and international success as soloist as well as member of different bands. His longtime cooperation and partnership with famous German rock singer Peter Maffay kept raising his popularity which he would campaign for social and humanitarian activities. Due to health problems he retired from the music business in 1989.

Tame was married and lived in Hamburg, Germany, until his passing March 2022.

Musical career 
Tame started his musical career in the early 1960s yet under his common name, Uwe Reuß. He performed as bassist, guitarist and singer in different German bands such as The Rascals (not to be mixed up with US-American Pop-Band The Rascals), The Gigolos and The Delegates. In 1964 he decided to make a living as a professional and gained attention in numerous Galas und TV-Shows, also in foreign German-speaking countries. Since 1967 he carried on using a pseudonym, Johnny Tame, and reached his biggest international success with his song "Sand in my Shoes". Tame played numerous festivals and was German representative at the Maltese Song-Festival "OSCAR" in 1968 where he finished third. The same year he contributed as singer on two songs of a Perry Rhodan movie using the pseudonym Sherman Space.

By entering the 1970s international concert, TV and radio shows in United States, Portugal, Belgium and Scandinavia increased. Tame formed the Johnny Tame's Time Machine in 1972 and was bassist and singer of the band Bourbon Family. Moreover, he played with the Orpheus Band of Schlagersinger Costa Cordalis until 1976. Though media- and stage-appearance got more and more, the crucial breakthrough would not succeed.

Tame and Maffay 
Tame had a very successful collaboration starting in 1976 with famous German Rock Singer Peter Maffay. As duo Tame & Maffay they produced two Country Rock albums. Moreover, Tame more or less went to be a constant guest at Maffay's studio- and live-productions until 1985 what finally earned Tame the long-awaited economic success. His overall album-sales gained multiple gold, platinum and diamond certifications. After all his deep disinterest in financial matters led to a subsequent monetary disaster.

Lasting problems during live and studio work due to Alcohol and Hashish consume have been spread as the main reasons for breaking up the cooperation in 1984. Only years later the public – and even Tame himself – came to know, that he was suffering from Chronic fatigue syndrome. His last production took place in 1986. He quit playing music and sealed himself off from any kind of public appearance. In 1989 he left his residence on East Frisian Island Borkum only for receiving the award "Artist of the year in Niedersachsen", a small city event in Northeim and a five-day-open-air festival in Bremen – The Breminale.

Social commitment 
Tame already used his popularity in an early stage of his career in order to support social and humanitarian projects as well as ecology groups. He broached the issues of air pollution, forest dieback or the use of nuclear energy – sometimes radically – long before those problems where picked out as a central theme in Germany and elsewhere. He played concerts with Joan Baez for Amnesty International and Humanitas in the early 1980s, also at the Concert for Afghanistan in Hamburg. He constantly supported Greenpeace and the German groups and initiatives Künstler für den Frieden, AGA Aktionsgemeinschaft Artenschutz and Nicaragua-Foundation of Dietmar Schönherr.

Discography 
Between 1965 und 1986 there has been a couple of musical publications with and by Johnny Tame, both in German and English language. 
Musical support usually was contributed by members of "Peter Maffay Band". The so far last release was a "Best of...." album produced by his long time friend and bandmate Frank Diez.

Singles
 1965
 The Delegates – Monkey Monkey / She's the one

 1966
 Gary and the Gamblers – Schöne Träume / Man redet soviel
 The Delegates – Walking in my sleep all night / Nitewalk

 1967
 Johnny Tame – Sand in my shoes / Steak and cake
 Johnny Tame – A lonely stretch of nothing / Yesterday is a thousand tears away

 1968
 Johnny Tame – Agatha Twichit / Ich geh’ meinen Weg
 Johnny Tame – Der einsame Mr. Brown / Unter jedem Himmel
 Johnny Tame – Honey Honey / Please let them be
 als "Sherman Space" – Count Down / Omicron 3

 1969
 Johnny Tame – Walter / Please let them be
 Johnny Tame – Schachmatt / Walking in my sleep allnight
 Archaeopterix – Barbarella / Samstag abend, Sonntag morgen
 Archaeopterix – Barbarella / No more living without loving

 1970
 Johnny Tame – You’ve guessed / Walking in my sleep allnight
 Johnny Tame – Sunny Honey Girl / Guitarman
 J & M – Ich sing’ für Dich / Alle reden von Liebe

 1971
 Bourbon Family – Allright okay / Oochee Boochee

 1972
 Bourbon Family – Shambala / I’ve got a tiger by the tail

 1977
 Tame & Maffay – Making it better / I can be so far away

 1979
 Tame & Maffay – Victory / Stop feeling blue

 1980
 Johnny Tame – Louisiana / I’m not gonna waste my time
 Johnny Tame – I’m stranded / Here in this land

 1981
 Johnny Tame – Time for peace / Rescue

EPs
 1982
 Tame & Maffay – You won't be hurt again

Album
 1977
 Tame & Maffay – Tame & Maffay I

 1979
 Tame & Maffay – Tame & Maffay II

 1980
 Johnny Tame – Indistinct horizon

 1981
 Johnny Tame – Untamed

CDs
 1998
 Johnny Tame – Johnny Tame (Best of)

Collaboration
 1976
 Peter Maffay – Es war Sommer (Ich such’ meinen Stern)

 1977
 Peter Maffay – Dein Gesicht

 1978
 Peter Maffay – Live

 1979
 Peter Maffay – Steppenwolf

 1980
 Peter Maffay – Revanche
 Volker Lechtenbrink – Dame & Clown (Jet Set, Meine kleine Schwester)

 1982
 Peter Maffay – Live 82
 Peter Maffay – Ich will leben

 1986
 Double V Connection – UnderTaKing

Awards 
 1980 Artist of the year – Pop National by Deutsche Phonoakademie
 1980 German Record Award by Deutsche Phonoakademie for the album Tame & Maffay II

References

External links 
 
 Tame & Maffay 1977 in German TV show ZDF Disco

1947 births
Living people
German guitarists
German singer-songwriters
German male musicians
Musicians from Hamburg
German male guitarists